Leo Kosov-Meyer is a fictional television character portrayed by Nikolai Nikolaeff on the popular Australian television drama Sea Patrol.

Leo, better known as "2 Dads,” is the crew's Electronics Technician, replacing the late Leading Seaman Josh Holiday ("E.T").
He made his debut onscreen appearance in Episode 2, Series 3, titled "Monkey Business.”

2 Dads’ time aboard the Hammersley starts off on the wrong foot. He buys a monkey and secretly stows it away on board the ship. He makes fast friends with Spider, and gets himself into much mischief, including a run-in into Buffer, over Nav's difficulties. Later in the episode, he releases the monkey, only to find the salesman whom he purchased the monkey from, but short-changed during payment. 2 Dads pulls off a daring rescue, earning the respect of the Navy personnel on Hammersley, except for Nav.

Later, in the episode “Pearls Before Swine,” 2 Dads is berated by Buffer and XO. This causes him to start a rumor that they are romantically involved. The rumor spreads throughout the ship, until it reaches the ears of the CO, who once had a relationship with the XO. CO finally traces the rumor's back to 2 Dads, and warns him that if he makes mischief again, not only will he leave Hammersley, his position in the Navy will be terminated. Buffer and XO are given the pleasure of charging him however they please. But when 2 Dads tells the two of his current position, XO takes pity on him and gives him the task of recovering the stolen pearls, believed to have been ingested by a party-goer they came across tracking some pearl thieves. 2 Dads laces their food with the ship's "industrial-strength" medical laxative with success, although details about the rest of the recovery remain undiscovered.

2 Dads has a laid-back and careless attitude - he's a joker, player, a monkey smuggler and all-round bad boy and Nav finds it hard to welcome him, as he is the replacement for the late ET, who was Nav's fiancé. Nav describes him as "up-himself and unprofessional." However, the crew do welcome him and he fast becomes 'one of them', proving himself Navy-worthy.

Despite this, in the series finale, it is revealed that he will eventually desert from the Navy when in port in Singapore.

Awards

Australian Defence Medal

Sea Patrol characters
Fictional Royal Australian Navy personnel